David Richard Connor (born 27 October 1945) was an English football defender who played for  Manchester City between 1964 and 1971 making 141 appearances and scoring 10 goals. He played for the Division One championship-winning side in 1967–68, making 13 appearances. He also played as they won the 1968 FA Charity Shield.

He later played for Preston North End and Macclesfield Town, when he was appointed player/manager. He made 35 league appearances and scored one goal, but following a series of disappointing results he resigned as manager in February 1978.

References

External links
 Sporting Heroes biography of David Connor

1945 births
Living people
People from Wythenshawe
Footballers from Manchester
English footballers
Association football fullbacks
Manchester City F.C. players
Preston North End F.C. players
Macclesfield Town F.C. players
English Football League players
English football managers
Bury F.C. managers
Macclesfield Town F.C. managers
English Football League managers